The 2016–17 Georgia Southern Eagles women's basketball team represented Georgia Southern University in the 2016–17 NCAA Division I women's basketball season. The Eagles, led by second year head coach Kip Drown, played their home games at Hanner Fieldhouse and were members of the Sun Belt Conference. They finished the season 13–17, 9–9 in Sun Belt play to finish in sixth place. They lost in the first round of the Sun Belt women's tournament to Arkansas State.

Roster

Schedule

|-
!colspan=9 style="background:#000080; color:#FFFFFF;"| Exhibition

|-
!colspan=9 style="background:#000080; color:#FFFFFF;"| Non-conference regular season

|-
!colspan=9 style="background:#000080; color:#FFFFFF;"| Sun Belt regular season

|-
!colspan=9 style="background:#000080; color:#FFFFFF;"| Sun Belt Women's Tournament

See also
 2016–17 Georgia Southern Eagles men's basketball team

References

External links

Georgia Southern Eagles women's basketball seasons
Georgia Southern